The 2013 Sudan Premier League is the 42nd edition of the highest club level football competition in Sudan. Al-Hilal are defending champions.

Standings

References

RSSSF.com

Sudan Premier League seasons
Sudan
Sudan
football